Thrissops (from  , 'hair' and   'look') is an extinct genus of stem-teleost fish from the Jurassic and Cretaceous periods. Its fossils are known from the Solnhofen Limestone, as well as the Kimmeridge Clay.

It had a streamlined body with a deeply cleft tail and only very small pelvic fins. Thrissops was one of the smaller members of the order Ichthyodectiformes, which also included giants like Xiphactinus and Saurodon.

References

Prehistoric ray-finned fish genera
Late Jurassic bony fish
Late Jurassic fish of Europe
Ichthyodectiformes
Solnhofen fauna
Late Jurassic genus first appearances
Tithonian genera
Berriasian genera
Valanginian genera
Hauterivian genera
Barremian genera
Aptian genera
Albian genera
Cenomanian genera
Late Cretaceous genus extinctions
Taxa_named_by_Louis_Agassiz
Fossil taxa described in 1833